Assyrians are an indigenous ethnic group native to Assyria, a geographical region in Western Asia. Modern Assyrians descend from their ancient counterparts, originating from the ancient indigenous Mesopotamians of Akkad and Sumer, who first developed the civilisation in northern Mesopotamia (modern-day Iraq) that would become Assyria in 2600 BCE. Assyrians have been speaking dialects of Suret, a Semitic language of the Neo-Aramaic branch, since approximately 1000 BCE. Modern Assyrians may culturally self-identify as Syriacs, Chaldeans, or Arameans for religious, geographic and tribal identification.

Assyrians are almost exclusively Christian, with most adhering to the East and West Syriac liturgical rites of Christianity. The churches that constitute the East Syriac rite include the Chaldean Catholic Church, Assyrian Church of the East, and the Ancient Church of the East, whereas the churches of the West Syriac rite are the Syriac Orthodox Church and the Syriac Catholic Church. Both rites use Classical Syriac as their liturgical language.

The ancestral indigenous lands that form the Assyrian homeland are those of ancient Mesopotamia, a region currently divided between modern-day Iraq, southeastern Turkey, northwestern Iran, and northeastern Syria. A majority of modern Assyrians have migrated to other regions of the world, including North America, the Levant, Australia, Europe, Russia and the Caucasus. Emigration was triggered by tragic events such as the massacres in Hakkari, the massacres of Diyarbekır, the Assyrian genocide (concurrent with the Armenian and Greek genocides) during World War I by the Ottoman Empire and allied Kurdish tribes, the Simele massacre, the Iranian Revolution, Arab Nationalist Ba'athist policies in Iraq (between the years 1968–2003) and in Syria the take over by Islamic State of many parts in Syria and Iraq, particularly the Nineveh Plains between 2014–2017.

Most recently, events such as the 2003 invasion of Iraq by United States and its allies, and the Syrian civil war, which began in 2011, have displaced much of the remaining Assyrian community from their homeland as a result of ethnic and religious persecution at the hands of Islamic extremists. Of the one million or more Iraqis reported by the United Nations to have fled Iraq since the occupation, nearly 40% were the indigenous Assyrian people, even though Assyrians accounted for only around 3% of the pre-war Iraqi demography.

After the emergence of the Islamic State and the taking over of much of the Assyrian homeland by the terror group, another major wave of Assyrian displacement took place. The Islamic State was driven out from the Assyrian villages in the Khabour River Valley and the areas surrounding the city of Al-Hasakah in Syria by 2015, and from the Nineveh Plains in Iraq by 2017.  In 2014, the Nineveh Plain Protection Units was formed and many Assyrians joined the force to defend themselves. The organization later became part of Iraqi Armed forces and played a key role in liberating areas previously held by the Islamic State during the War in Iraq. In northern Syria, Assyrian groups have been taking part both politically and militarily in the Kurdish-dominated but multiethnic Syrian Democratic Forces (see Khabour Guards and Sutoro) and Autonomous Administration of North and East Syria.

History

Pre-Christian history 

Assyria is the homeland of the Assyrian people; it is located in the ancient Near East. In prehistoric times, the region that was to become known as Assyria (and Subartu) was home to Neanderthals such as the remains of those which have been found at the Shanidar Cave. The earliest Neolithic sites in Assyria belonged to the Jarmo culture c. 7100 BC and Tell Hassuna, the centre of the Hassuna culture, c. 6000 BC.

The history of Assyria begins with the formation of the city of Assur, perhaps as early as the 25th century BC. During the early Bronze Age period, Sargon of Akkad united all the native Semitic-speaking peoples (including the Assyrians) and the Sumerians of Mesopotamia under the Akkadian Empire (2335–2154 BC). The cities of Assur and Nineveh (modern-day Mosul), which was the oldest and largest city of the ancient Assyrian Empire, together with a number of other towns and cities, existed as early as the 25th century BC, although they appear to have been Sumerian-ruled administrative centres at this time, rather than independent states. The Sumerians were eventually absorbed into the Akkadian (Assyro-Babylonian) population. An Assyrian identity distinct from other neighboring groups appears to have formed during the Old Assyrian period, in the 21st or 20th century BC.

In the traditions of the Assyrian Church of the East, they are descended from Abraham's grandson (Dedan son of Jokshan), progenitor of the ancient Assyrians. However, there is no other historical basis for this assertion; the Hebrew Bible does not directly mention it, and there is no mention in Assyrian records (which date as far back as the 25th century BC). What is known is that Ashur-uballit I overthrew the Mitanni c. 1365 BC, and the Assyrians benefited from this development by taking control of the eastern portion of Mitanni territory, and later also annexing Hittite, Babylonian, Amorite and Hurrian territories. The rise and rule of the Middle Assyrian Empire (14th to 10th century BC) spread Assyrian culture, people and identity across northern Mesopotamia.

The Assyrian people, after the fall of the Neo-Assyrian Empire in 609 BC, were under the control of the Neo-Babylonian Empire and later, the Persian Empire, which consumed the entire Neo-Babylonian or "Chaldean" Empire in 539 BC. Assyrians became front line soldiers for the Persian Empire under Xerxes I, playing a major role in the Battle of Marathon under Darius I in 490 BC. However Herodotus, whose Histories are the main source of information about that battle, makes no mention of Assyrians in connection with it.

Despite the influx of foreign elements, the presence of Assyrians is confirmed by the worship of the god Ashur; references to the name survive into the 3rd century AD. The Greeks, Parthians, and Romans had a rather low level of integration with the local population in Mesopotamia, which allowed their cultures to survive. Semi-independent kingdoms influenced by Assyrian culture (Hatra, Adiabene, Osroene) and perhaps semi-autonomous Assyrian vassal states (Assur) sprung up in the east under Parthian rule, lasting until conquests by the Sasanian Empire in the region in the 3rd century AD.

Language
Modern Assyrian derives from ancient Aramaic, part of the Northwest Semitic languages.

In around 700 BC, Aramaic slowly started to replace Akkadian in Assyria, Babylonia and the Levant. Widespread bilingualism among Assyrian nationals was already present prior to the fall of the empire.

The Kültepe texts, which were written in Old Assyrian, preserve some loanwords from the Hittite language. Those loanwords are the earliest attestation of any Indo-European language, dated to the 20th century BC. Most of the archaeological evidence is typical of Anatolia rather than of Assyria, but the use of both cuneiform and the dialect is the best indication of Assyrian presence. To date, over 20,000 cuneiform tablets have been recovered from the site.

From 1700 BC and onward, the Sumerian language was preserved by the ancient Babylonians and Assyrians only as a liturgical and classical language for religious, artistic and scholarly purposes.

The Akkadian language, with its main dialects of Assyrian and Babylonian, once the lingua franca of the Ancient Near East, began to decline during the Neo-Assyrian Empire around the 8th century BC, being marginalized by Old Aramaic during the reign of Tiglath-Pileser III. By the Hellenistic period, the language was largely confined to scholars and priests working in temples in Assyria and Babylonia.

Early Christian period

From the 1st century BC, Assyria was the theatre of the protracted Roman–Persian Wars. Much of the region would become the Roman province of Assyria from 116 AD to 118 AD following the conquests of Trajan, but after a Parthian-inspired Assyrian rebellion, the new emperor Hadrian withdrew from the short-lived province Assyria and its neighboring provinces in 118 AD. Following a successful campaign in 197–198, Severus converted the kingdom of Osroene, centred on Edessa, into a frontier Roman province. Roman influence in the area came to an end under Jovian in 363, who abandoned the region after concluding a hasty peace agreement with the Sassanians.

The Assyrians were Christianized in the first to third centuries in Roman Syria and Roman Assyria. The population of the Sasanian province of Asoristan was a mixed one, composed of Assyrians, Arameans in the far south and the western deserts, and Persians. The Greek element in the cities, still strong during the Parthian Empire, ceased to be ethnically distinct in Sasanian times. The majority of the population were Eastern Aramaic speakers.

Along with the Arameans, Armenians, Greeks, and Nabataeans, the Assyrians were among the first people to convert to Christianity and spread Eastern Christianity to the Far East in spite of becoming, from the 8th century, a minority religion in their homeland following the Muslim conquest of Persia.

In 410, the Council of Seleucia-Ctesiphon, the capital of the Sasanian Empire, organized the Christians within that empire into what became known as the Church of the East. Its head was declared to be the bishop of Seleucia-Ctesiphon, who in the acts of the council was referred to as the Grand or Major Metropolitan, and who soon afterward was called the Catholicos of the East. Later, the title of Patriarch was also used. Dioceses were organised into provinces, each of which was under the authority of a metropolitan bishop. Six such provinces were instituted in 410.

Another council held in 424 declared that the Catholicos of the East was independent of "western" ecclesiastical authorities (those of the Roman Empire).

Soon afterwards, Christians in the Roman Empire were divided by their attitude regarding the Council of Ephesus (431), which condemned Nestorianism, and the Council of Chalcedon (451), which condemned Monophysitism. Those who for any reason refused to accept one or other of these councils were called Nestorians or Monophysites, while those who accepted both councils, held under the auspices of the Roman emperors, were called Melkites (derived from Syriac malkā, king), meaning royalists. All three groups existed among the Syriac Christians, the East Syriacs being called Nestorians and the West Syriacs being divided between the Monophysites (today the Syriac Orthodox Church, also known as Jacobites, after Jacob Baradaeus) and those who accepted both councils (primarily today's Eastern Orthodox Church, which has adopted the Byzantine Rite in Greek, but also the Maronite Church, which kept its West Syriac Rite and was not as closely aligned with Constantinople). Roman/Byzantine and Persian spheres of influence divided Syriac-speaking Christians into two groups: those who adhered to the Miaphysite Syriac Orthodox Church (the so-called Jacobite Church), or West Syrians, and those who adhered to the Church of the East (the so-called Nestorian Church). They developed distinct dialects, mainly based on the pronunciation and written symbolization of vowels, following the split. With the rise of Syriac Christianity, eastern Aramaic enjoyed a renaissance as a classical language in the 2nd to 8th centuries, and varieties of that form of Aramaic (Neo-Aramaic languages) are still spoken by a few small groups of Jacobite and Nestorian Christians in the Middle East.

Arab conquest 

The Assyrians initially experienced some periods of religious and cultural freedom interspersed with periods of severe religious and ethnic persecution after the 7th century Muslim conquest of Persia. Assyrians contributed to Islamic civilizations during the Umayyad and Abbasid Caliphates by translating works of Greek philosophers to Syriac and afterwards to Arabic. They also excelled in philosophy, science (Masawaiyh, Eutychius of Alexandria, and Jabril ibn Bukhtishu) and theology (such as Tatian, Bardaisan, Babai the Great, Nestorius, and Thomas of Marga) and the personal physicians of the Abbasid Caliphs were often Assyrians, such as the long-serving Bukhtishu dynasty. Many scholars of the House of Wisdom were of Assyrian Christian background.

Indigenous Assyrians became second-class citizens (dhimmi) in a greater Arab Islamic state, and those who resisted Arabization and conversion to Islam were subject to severe religious, ethnic and cultural discrimination, and had certain restrictions imposed upon them. Assyrians were excluded from specific duties and occupations reserved for Muslims, they did not enjoy the same political rights as Muslims, their word was not equal to that of a Muslim in legal and civil matters, as Christians they were subject to payment of a special tax (jizya), they were banned from spreading their religion further or building new churches in Muslim-ruled lands, but were also expected to adhere to the same laws of property, contract and obligation as the Muslim Arabs. They could not seek conversion of a Muslim, a non-Muslim man could not marry a Muslim woman, and the child of such a marriage would be considered Muslim. They could not own a Muslim slave and had to wear different clothing from Muslims in order to be distinguishable. In addition to the jizya tax, they were also required to pay the kharaj tax on their land which was heavier than the jizya. However they were ensured protection, given religious freedom and to govern themselves in accordance to their own laws.

As non-Islamic proselytising was punishable by death under Sharia, the Assyrians were forced into preaching in Transoxiana, Central Asia, India, Mongolia and China where they established numerous churches. The Church of the East was considered to be one of the major Christian powerhouses in the world, alongside Latin Christianity in Europe and the Byzantine Empire.

From the 7th century AD onwards Mesopotamia saw a steady influx of Arabs, Kurds and other Iranian peoples, and later Turkic peoples. Assyrians were increasingly marginalized, persecuted, and gradually became a minority in their own homeland. Conversion to Islam as a result of heavy taxation which also resulted in decreased revenue from their rulers. As a result, the new converts migrated to Muslim garrison towns nearby.

Assyrians remained dominant in Upper Mesopotamia as late as the 14th century, and the city of Assur was still occupied by Assyrians during the Islamic period until the mid-14th century when the Muslim Turco-Mongol ruler Timur conducted a religiously motivated massacre against Assyrians. After, there were no records of Assyrians remaining in Assur according to the archaeological and numismatic record. From this point, the Assyrian population was dramatically reduced in their homeland.

From the 19th century, after the rise of nationalism in the Balkans, the Ottomans started viewing Assyrians and other Christians in their eastern front as a potential threat. The Kurdish Emirs sought to consolidate their power by attacking Assyrian communities which were already well-established there. Scholars estimate that tens of thousands of Assyrian in the Hakkari region were massacred in 1843 when Bedr Khan Beg, the emir of Bohtan, invaded their region. After a later massacre in 1846, the Ottomans were forced by the western powers into intervening in the region, and the ensuing conflict destroyed the Kurdish emirates and reasserted the Ottoman power in the area. The Assyrians were subject to the massacres of Diyarbakır soon after.

Being culturally, ethnically, and linguistically distinct from their Muslim neighbors in the Middle East—the Arabs, Persians, Kurds, Turks—the Assyrians have endured much hardship throughout their recent history as a result of religious and ethnic persecution by these groups.

Mongolian and Turkic rule

After initially coming under the control of the Seljuk Empire and the Buyid dynasty, the region eventually came under the control of the Mongol Empire after the fall of Baghdad in 1258. The Mongol khans were sympathetic with Christians and did not harm them. The most prominent among them was probably Isa Kelemechi, a diplomat, astrologer, and head of the Christian affairs in Yuan China. He spent some time in Persia under the Ilkhanate. The 14th century massacres of Timur devastated the Assyrian people. Timur's massacres and pillages of all that was Christian drastically reduced their existence. At the end of the reign of Timur, the Assyrian population had almost been eradicated in many places. Toward the end of the thirteenth century, Bar Hebraeus, the noted Assyrian scholar and hierarch, found "much quietness" in his diocese in Mesopotamia. Syria's diocese, he wrote, was "wasted."

The region was later controlled by the in Iran-based Turkic confederations of the Aq Qoyunlu and Kara Koyunlu. Subsequently, all Assyrians, like with the rest of the ethnicities living in the former Aq Qoyunlu territories, fell into Safavid hands from 1501 and on.

From Iranian Safavid to confirmed Ottoman rule 

The Ottomans secured their control over Mesopotamia and Syria in the first half of the 17th century following the Ottoman–Safavid War (1623–39) and the resulting Treaty of Zuhab. Non-Muslims were organised into millets. Syriac Christians, however, were often considered one millet alongside Armenians until the 19th century, when Nestorian, Syriac Orthodox and Chaldeans gained that right as well.

The Aramaic-speaking Mesopotamian Christians had long been divided between followers of the Church of the East, commonly referred to as "Nestorians", and followers of the Syriac Orthodox Church, commonly called Jacobites. The latter were organised by Marutha of Tikrit (565–649) as 17 dioceses under a "Metropolitan of the East" or "Maphrian", holding the highest rank in the Syriac Orthodox Church after that of the Syriac Orthodox Patriarch of Antioch and All the East. The Maphrian resided at Tikrit until 1089, when he moved to the city of Mosul for half a century, before settling in the nearby Monastery of Mar Mattai (still belonging to the Syriac Orthodox Church) and thus not far from the residence of the Eliya line of Patriarchs of the Church of the East. From 1533, the holder of the office was known as the Maphrian of Mosul, to distinguish him from the Maphrian of the Patriarch of Tur Abdin.

In 1552, a group of bishops of the Church of the East from the northern regions of Amid and Salmas, who were dissatisfied with reservation of patriarchal succession to members of a single family, even if the designated successor was little more than a child, elected as a rival patriarch the abbot of the Rabban Hormizd Monastery, Yohannan Sulaqa. This was by no means the first schism in the Church of the East. An example is the attempt to replace Timothy I (779–823) with Ephrem of Gandīsābur.

By tradition, a patriarch could be ordained only by someone of archiepiscopal (metropolitan) rank, a rank to which only members of that one family were promoted. For that reason, Sulaqa travelled to Rome, where, presented as the new patriarch elect, he entered communion with the Catholic Church and was ordained by the Pope and recognized as patriarch. The title or description under which he was recognized as patriarch is given variously as "Patriarch of Mosul in Eastern Syria"; "Patriarch of the Church of the Chaldeans of Mosul"; "Patriarch of the Chaldeans"; "Patriarch of Mosul"; or "Patriarch of the Eastern Assyrians", this last being the version given by Pietro Strozzi on the second-last unnumbered page before page 1 of his De Dogmatibus Chaldaeorum, of which an English translation is given in Adrian Fortescue's Lesser Eastern Churches.

Mar Shimun VIII Yohannan Sulaqa returned to northern Mesopotamia in the same year and fixed his seat in Amid. Before being imprisoned for four months and then in January 1555 put to death by the governor of Amadiya at the instigation of the rival patriarch of Alqosh, of the Eliya line, he ordained two metropolitans and three other bishops, thus beginning a new ecclesiastical hierarchy: the patriarchal line known as the Shimun line. The area of influence of this patriarchate soon moved from Amid east, fixing the see, after many changes, in the isolated village of Qochanis.

The Shimun line eventually drifted away from Rome and in 1662 adopted a profession of faith incompatible with that of Rome. Leadership of those who wished communion with Rome passed to the Archbishop of Amid Joseph I, recognized first by the Turkish civil authorities (1677) and then by Rome itself (1681). A century and a half later, in 1830, headship of the Catholics (the Chaldean Catholic Church) was conferred on Yohannan Hormizd, a member of the family that for centuries had provided the patriarchs of the legitimist "Eliya line", who had won over most of the followers of that line. Thus the patriarchal line of those who in 1553 entered communion with Rome are now patriarchs of the "traditionalist" wing of the Church of the East, that which in 1976 officially adopted the name "Assyrian Church of the East".

In the 1840s many of the Assyrians living in the mountains of Hakkari in the south eastern corner of the Ottoman Empire were massacred by the Kurdish emirs of Hakkari and Bohtan.

Another major massacre of Assyrians (and Armenians) in the Ottoman Empire occurred between 1894 and 1897 by Turkish troops and their Kurdish allies during the rule of Sultan Abdul Hamid II. The motives for these massacres were an attempt to reassert Pan-Islamism in the Ottoman Empire, resentment at the comparative wealth of the ancient indigenous Christian communities, and a fear that they would attempt to secede from the tottering Ottoman Empire. Assyrians were massacred in Diyarbakir, Hasankeyef, Sivas and other parts of Anatolia, by Sultan Abdul Hamid II. These attacks caused the death of over thousands of Assyrians and the forced "Ottomanisation" of the inhabitants of 245 villages. The Turkish troops looted the remains of the Assyrian settlements and these were later stolen and occupied by Kurds. Unarmed Assyrian women and children were raped, tortured and murdered.

World War I and aftermath 

The Assyrians suffered a number of religiously and ethnically motivated massacres throughout the 17th, 18th and 19th centuries, culminating in the large-scale Hamidian massacres of unarmed men, women and children by Muslim Turks and Kurds in the late 19th century at the hands of the Ottoman Empire and its associated (largely Kurdish and Arab) militias, which further greatly reduced numbers, particularly in southeastern Turkey.

The most significant recent persecution against the Assyrian population was the Assyrian genocide which occurred during the First World War. Between 275,000 and 300,000 Assyrians were estimated to have been slaughtered by the armies of the Ottoman Empire and their Kurdish allies, totalling up to two-thirds of the entire Assyrian population.

This led to a large-scale migration of Turkish-based Assyrian people into countries such as Syria, Iran, and Iraq (where they were to suffer further violent assaults at the hands of the Arabs and Kurds), as well as other neighbouring countries in and around the Middle East such as Armenia, Georgia and Russia.

Assyrian volunteers

In reaction to the Assyrian Genocide and lured by British and Russian promises of an independent nation, the Assyrians led by Agha Petros and Malik Khoshaba of the Bit-Tyari tribe, fought alongside the Allies against Ottoman forces known as the Assyrian volunteers or Our Smallest Ally. Despite being heavily outnumbered and outgunned the Assyrians fought successfully, scoring a number of victories over the Turks and Kurds. This situation continued until their Russian allies left the war, and Armenian resistance broke, leaving the Assyrians surrounded, isolated and cut off from lines of supply. The sizable Assyrian presence in south eastern Anatolia which had endured for over four millennia was thus reduced significantly by the end of World War I.

Assyrian rebellion

The Assyrian rebellion was an uprising by the Assyrians in Hakkari that began on the 3rd of September 1924 and ended on the 28th of September. The Assyrians of Tyari and Tkhuma returned to their ancestral land in Hakkari in 1922, shortly after World War I without permission from the Turkish government. This led to clashes between the Assyrians and the Turkish army with their Kurdish allies that grew into a rebellion in 1924, it ended with the Assyrians being forced to retreat to Iraq.

Modern history 

The majority of Assyrians living in what is today modern Turkey were forced to flee to either Syria or Iraq after the Turkish victory during the Turkish War of Independence. In 1932, Assyrians refused to become part of the newly formed state of Iraq and instead demanded their recognition as a nation within a nation. The Assyrian leader Shimun XXI Eshai asked the League of Nations to recognize the right of the Assyrians to govern the area known as the "Assyrian triangle" in northern Iraq. During the French mandate period, some Assyrians, fleeing ethnic cleansings in Iraq during the Simele massacre, established numerous villages along the Khabur River during the 1930s.

The Assyrian Levies were founded by the British in 1928, with ancient Assyrian military rankings such as Rab-shakeh, Rab-talia and Tartan, being revived for the first time in millennia for this force. The Assyrians were prized by the British rulers for their fighting qualities, loyalty, bravery and discipline, and were used to help the British put down insurrections among the Arabs and Kurds. During World War II, eleven Assyrian companies saw action in Palestine and another four served in Cyprus. The Parachute Company was attached to the Royal Marine Commando and were involved in fighting in Albania, Italy and Greece. The Assyrian Levies played a major role in subduing the pro-Nazi Iraqi forces at the battle of Habbaniya in 1941.

However, this cooperation with the British was viewed with suspicion by some leaders of the newly formed Kingdom of Iraq. The tension reached its peak shortly after the formal declaration of independence when hundreds of Assyrian civilians were slaughtered during the Simele massacre by the Iraqi Army in August 1933. The events lead to the expulsion of Shimun XXI Eshai the Catholicos Patriarch of the Assyrian Church of the East to the United States where resided until his death in 1975.

The period from the 1940s through to 1963 saw a period of respite for the Assyrians. The regime of President Abd al-Karim Qasim in particular saw the Assyrians accepted into mainstream society. Many urban Assyrians became successful businessmen, others were well represented in politics and the military, their towns and villages flourished undisturbed, and Assyrians came to excel, and be over represented in sports.

The Ba'ath Party seized power in Iraq and Syria in 1963, introducing laws aimed at suppressing the Assyrian national identity via arabization policies. The giving of traditional Assyrian names was banned and Assyrian schools, political parties, churches and literature were repressed. Assyrians were heavily pressured into identifying as Iraqi/Syrian Christians. Assyrians were not recognized as an ethnic group by the governments and they fostered divisions among Assyrians along religious lines (e.g. Assyrian Church of the East vs. Chaldean Catholic Church vs Syriac Orthodox Church).

In response to Baathist persecution, the Assyrians of the Zowaa movement within the Assyrian Democratic Movement took up armed struggle against the Iraqi government in 1982 under the leadership of Yonadam Kanna, and then joined up with the Iraqi-Kurdistan Front in the early 1990s. Yonadam Kanna in particular was a target of the Saddam Hussein Ba'ath government for many years.

The Anfal campaign of 1986–1989 in Iraq, which was intended to target Kurdish opposition, resulted in 2,000 Assyrians being murdered through its gas campaigns. Over 31 towns and villages, 25 Assyrian monasteries and churches were razed to the ground. Some Assyrians were murdered, others were deported to large cities, and their lands and homes then being appropriated by Arabs and Kurds.

21st century 

After the 2003 Invasion of Iraq by US and its allies, the Coalition Provisional Authority disbanded the Iraqi military, security, and intelligence infrastructure of former President Saddam Hussein and began a process of "de-Baathification". This process became an object of controversy, cited by some critics as the biggest American mistake made in the immediate aftermath of the Invasion of Iraq, and as one of the main causes in the deteriorating security situation throughout Iraq. Social unrest and chaos resulted in the unprovoked persecution of Assyrians in Iraq mostly by Islamic extremists (both Shia and Sunni) and Kurdish nationalists (ex. Dohuk Riots of 2011 aimed at Assyrians & Yazidis). In places such as Dora, a neighborhood in southwestern Baghdad, the majority of its Assyrian population has either fled abroad or to northern Iraq, or has been murdered. Islamic resentment over the United States' occupation of Iraq, and incidents such as the Jyllands-Posten Muhammad cartoons and the Pope Benedict XVI Islam controversy, have resulted in Muslims attacking Assyrian communities. Since the start of the Iraq war, at least 46 churches and monasteries have been bombed.

In recent years, the Assyrians in northern Iraq and northeast Syria have become the target of extreme unprovoked Islamic terrorism. As a result, Assyrians have taken up arms alongside other groups (such as the Kurds, Turcomans and Armenians) in response to unprovoked attacks by Al Qaeda, the Islamic State (ISIL), Nusra Front and other terrorist Islamic Fundamentalist groups. In 2014 Islamic terrorists of ISIL attacked Assyrian towns and villages in the Assyrian Homeland of northern Iraq, together with cities such as Mosul and Kirkuk which have large Assyrian populations. There have been reports of atrocities committed by ISIL terrorists since, including; beheadings, crucifixions, child murders, rape, forced conversions, ethnic cleansing, robbery, and extortion in the form of illegal taxes levied upon non-Muslims. Assyrians in Iraq have responded by forming armed militias to defend their territories.

In response to the Islamic State's invasion of the Assyrian homeland in 2014, many Assyrian organizations also formed their own independent fighting forces to combat ISIL and potentially retake their "ancestral lands." These include the Nineveh Plain Protection Units, Dwekh Nawsha, and the Nineveh Plain Forces. The latter two of these militias were eventually disbanded.
 
In Syria, the Dawronoye modernization movement has influenced Assyrian identity in the region. The largest proponent of the movement, the Syriac Union Party (SUP) has become a major political actor in the Democratic Federation of Northern Syria. In August 2016, the Ourhi Centre in the city of Zalin was started by the Assyrian community, to educate teachers in order to make Syriac an optional language of instruction in public schools, which then started with the 2016/17 academic year. With that academic year, states the Rojava Education Committee, "three curriculums have replaced the old one, to include teaching in three languages: Kurdish, Arabic and Assyrian." Associated with the SUP is the Syriac Military Council, an Assyrian militia operating in Syria, established in January 2013 to protect and stand up for the national rights of Assyrians in Syria as well as working together with the other communities in Syria to change the current government of Bashar al-Assad.  However, many Assyrians and the organizations that represent them, particularly those outside of Syria, are critical of the Dawronoye movement.

A 2018 report stated that Kurdish authorities in Syria, in conjunction with Dawronoye officials, had shut down several Assyrian schools in Northern Syria and fired their administration. This was said to be because these schooled failed to register for a license and for rejecting the new curriculum approved by the Education Authority. Closure methods ranged from officially shutting down schools to having armed men enter the schools and shut them down forcefully. An Assyrian educator named Isa Rashid was later badly beaten outside of his home for rejecting the Kurdish self-administration's curriculum.
The Assyrian Policy Institute claimed that an Assyrian reporter named Souleman Yusph was arrested by Kurdish forces for his reports on the Dawronoye-related school closures in Syria. Specifically, he had shared numerous photographs on Facebook detailing the closures.

Demographics

Homeland 

The Assyrian homeland includes the ancient cities of Nineveh (Mosul), Nuhadra (Dohuk), Arrapha/Beth Garmai (Kirkuk), Al Qosh, Tesqopa and Arbela (Erbil) in Iraq, Urmia in Iran, and Hakkari (a large region which comprises the modern towns of Yüksekova, Hakkâri, Çukurca, Şemdinli and Uludere), Edessa/Urhoy (Urfa), Harran, Amida (Diyarbakır) and Tur Abdin (Midyat and Kafro) in Turkey, among others. Some of the cities are presently under Kurdish control and some still have an Assyrian presence, namely those in Iraq, as the Assyrian population in southeastern Turkey (such as those in Hakkari) was ethnically cleansed during the Assyrian genocide of the First World War. Those who survived fled to unaffected areas of Assyrian settlement in northern Iraq, with others settling in Iraqi cities to the south. Though many also immigrated to neighbouring countries in and around the Caucasus and Middle East like Armenia, Syria, Georgia, southern Russia, Lebanon and Jordan.

In ancient times, Akkadian-speaking Assyrians have existed in what is now Syria, Jordan, Palestine, Israel and Lebanon, among other modern countries, due to the sprawl of the Neo-Assyrian empire in the region. Though recent settlement of Christian Assyrians in Nisabina, Qamishli, Al-Hasakah, Al-Qahtaniyah, Al Darbasiyah, Al-Malikiyah, Amuda, Tel Tamer and a few other small towns in Al-Hasakah Governorate in Syria, occurred in the early 1930s, when they fled from northern Iraq after they were targeted and slaughtered during the Simele massacre. The Assyrians in Syria did not have Syrian citizenship and title to their established land until late the 1940s.

Sizable Assyrian populations only remain in Syria, where an estimated 400,000 Assyrians live, and in Iraq, where an estimated 300,000 Assyrians live. In Iran and Turkey, only small populations remain, with only 20,000 Assyrians in Iran, and a small but growing Assyrian population in Turkey, where 25,000 Assyrians live, mostly in the cities and not the ancient settlements. In Tur Abdin, a traditional center of Assyrian culture, there are only 2,500 Assyrians left. Down from 50,000 in the 1960 census, but up from 1,000 in 1992. This sharp decline is due to an intense conflict between Turkey and the PKK in the 1980s. However, there are an estimated 25,000 Assyrians in all of Turkey, with most living in Istanbul. Most Assyrians currently reside in the West due to the centuries of persecution by the neighboring Muslims. Prior to the Islamic State of Iraq and the Levant, in a 2013 report by a Chaldean Syriac Assyrian Popular Council official, it was estimated that 300,000 Assyrians remained in Iraq.

Assyrian subgroups
There are three main Assyrian subgroups: Eastern, Western, Chaldean. These subdivisions are only partially overlapping linguistically, historically, culturally, and religiously.
 The Eastern subgroup historically inhabited Hakkari in the northern Zagros Mountains, the Simele and Sapna valleys in Nuhadra, and parts of the Nineveh and Urmia Plains. They speak Northeastern Neo-Aramaic dialects and are religiously diverse, adhering to the East Syriac churches and Protestantism. 
 The Chaldean subgroup is a subgroup of the Eastern one. The group is often equated with the adherents of the Chaldean Catholic Church, however not all Chaldean Catholics identify as Chaldean. They are traditionally speakers of Northeastern Neo-Aramaic dialects, however there are some Turoyo speakers. In Iraq, Chaldean Catholics inhabit the western Nineveh Plains villages of Alqosh, Batnaya, Tel Keppe and Tesqopa, as well as the Nahla valley and Aqra. In Syria they live in Aleppo and the Al-Hasakah Governorate. In Turkey, they live scattered in Istanbul, Diyarbakir, Sirnak Province and Mardin Province.
 The Western subgroup, historically inhabited Tur Abdin. They mainly speak the Central Neo-Aramaic language Surayt (also known as Turoyo). Most adhere to the West Syriac churches, such as the Syriac Orthodox Church of Antioch and the Syriac Catholic Church. Today there are also evangelical groups that have founded their own churches in the diaspora. Historically, Syriac Orthodox culture was centered in two monasteries near Mardin (west of Tur Abdin), Mor Gabriel and Deyrulzafaran. Historic Assyrian villages, some of which are still inhabited by Assyrians in Turabdin, include the following: Aynwardo, Anhil, Kafro, Miden, Arnas, Beth Debe, Beth Kustan, Beth Sbirino, Dayro da-Slibo, Hrabemishka, Qartmin, Arkah, Arbo, Mizizah, Kfraze, Hah, Marbobo, Salah, Sare and Hapsis. In addition, the cities of Midyat and Beth Zabday (Azech) were historically Assyrian cities with an Assyrian majority, this is no longer the case today. Outside of the area of core Assyrian settlement in Tur Abdin, there were also sizable populations in the towns of Diyarbakır, Urfa, Harput, and Adiyaman as well as some other villages.

Persecution 
Due to their Christian faith and ethnicity, the Assyrians have been persecuted since their adoption of Christianity. During the reign of Yazdegerd I, Christians in Persia were viewed with suspicion as potential Roman subversives, resulting in persecutions while at the same time promoting Nestorian Christianity as a buffer between the Churches of Rome and Persia. Persecutions and attempts to impose Zoroastrianism continued during the reign of Yazdegerd II.

During the eras of Mongol rule under Genghis Khan and Timur, there was indiscriminate slaughter of tens of thousands of Assyrians and destruction of the Assyrian population of northwestern Iran and central and northern Iran.

More recent persecutions since the 19th century include the massacres of Badr Khan, the massacres of Diyarbakır (1895), the Adana massacre, the Assyrian genocide, the Simele massacre, and the al-Anfal campaign.

Diaspora 
 

Since the Assyrian genocide, many Assyrians have left the Middle East entirely for a more safe and comfortable life in the countries of the Western world. As a result of this, the Assyrian population in the Middle East has decreased dramatically. As of today there are more Assyrians in the diaspora than in their homeland. The largest Assyrian diaspora communities are found in Sweden (100,000), Germany (100,000), the United States (80,000), and in Australia (46,000).

By ethnic percentage, the largest Assyrian diaspora communities are located in Södertälje in Stockholm County, Sweden, and in Fairfield City in Sydney, Australia, where they are the leading ethnic group in the suburbs of Fairfield, Fairfield Heights, Prairiewood and Greenfield Park. There is also a sizable Assyrian community in Melbourne, Australia (Broadmeadows, Meadow Heights and Craigieburn) In the United States, Assyrians are mostly found in Chicago (Niles and Skokie), Detroit (Sterling Heights, and West Bloomfield Township), Phoenix, Modesto (Stanislaus County) and Turlock.

Furthermore, small Assyrian communities are found in San Diego, Sacramento and Fresno in the United States, Toronto in Canada and also in London, UK (London Borough of Ealing). In Germany, pocket-sized Assyrian communities are scattered throughout Munich, Frankfurt, Stuttgart, Berlin and Wiesbaden. In Paris, France, the commune of Sarcelles has a small number of Assyrians. Assyrians in the Netherlands mainly live in the east of the country, in the province of Overijssel. In Russia, small groups of Assyrians mostly reside in Krasnodar Kray and Moscow.

To note, the Assyrians residing in California and Russia tend to be from Iran, whilst those in Chicago and Sydney are predominantly Iraqi Assyrians. More recently, Syrian Assyrians are growing in size in Sydney after a huge influx of new arrivals in 2016, who were granted asylum under the Federal Government's special humanitarian intake. The Assyrians in Detroit are primarily Chaldean speakers, who also originate from Iraq. Assyrians in such European countries as Sweden and Germany would usually be Turoyo-speakers or Western Assyrians, and tend to be originally from Turkey.

Identity and subdivisions 

Syriac Christians of the Middle East and diaspora employ different terms for self-identification based on conflicting beliefs in the origin and identity of their respective communities. During the 19th century, English archaeologist Austen Henry Layard believed that the native Christian communities in the historical region of Assyria were descended from the ancient Assyrians, a view that was also shared by William Ainger Wigram. Although at the same time Horatio Southgate and George Thomas Bettany claimed during their travels through Mesopotamia that the Syriac Christians are the descendants of the Arameans.

Today, Assyrians and other minority ethnic groups in the Middle East, feel pressure to identify as "Arabs", "Turks" and "Kurds". In addition, Western media often makes no mention of any ethnic identity of the Christians in the region, and simply call refer to them as Christians, Iraqi Christians, Iranian Christians, Christians in Syria, and Turkish Christians, a label rejected by Assyrians.

Self-designation 

Below are terms commonly used by Assyrians to self-identify:.
 Assyrian, named after their ethnicity as the descendants of the ancient Assyrian people, is advocated by followers from within all Middle Eastern based East and West Syriac Rite Churches. (see Syriac Christianity)
 Chaldean is a term that was used for centuries by western writers and scholars as designation for the Aramaic language. It was so used by Jerome, and was still the normal terminology in the nineteenth century. Only in 1445 did it begin to be used to designate Aramaic speakers who had entered communion with the Catholic Church. This happened at the Council of Florence, which accepted the profession of faith that Timothy, metropolitan of the Aramaic speakers in Cyprus, made in Aramaic, and which decreed that "nobody shall in future dare to call [...] Chaldeans, Nestorians". Previously, when there were as yet no Catholic Aramaic speakers of Mesopotamian origin, the term "Chaldean" was applied with explicit reference to their "Nestorian" religion. Thus Jacques de Vitry wrote of them in 1220/1 that "they denied that Mary was the Mother of God and claimed that Christ existed in two persons. They consecrated leavened bread and used the 'Chaldean' (Syriac) language". Until the second half of the 19th century, the term "Chaldean" continued in general use for East Syriac Christians, whether "Nestorian" or Catholic. In 1840, upon visiting Mesopotamia, Horatio Southgate reported that local Chaldeans consider themselves to be descended from ancient Assyrians, and in some later works also noted the same origin of local Jacobites.
 Aramean, also known as Syriac-Aramean, named after the ancient Aramean people, is advocated by followers from within all Middle Eastern based East and West Syriac Rite Churches. Furthermore, Assyrians identifying as Aramean have obtained recognition from the Israeli government. To note, ancient Arameans were a separate ethnic group that lived concurrently with the Assyrian empire in what is now Syria and parts of Lebanon, Israel the West Bank and Gaza, Jordan, Iraq and Turkey.

Assyrian vs. Syrian naming controversy 

As early as the 8th century BC Luwian and Cilician subject rulers referred to their Assyrian overlords as Syrian, a western Indo-European corruption of the original term Assyrian. The Greeks used the terms "Syrian" and "Assyrian" interchangeably to indicate the indigenous Arameans, Assyrians and other inhabitants of the Near East, Herodotus considered "Syria" west of the Euphrates. Starting from the 2nd century BC onwards, ancient writers referred to the Seleucid ruler as the King of Syria or King of the Syrians. The Seleucids designated the districts of Seleucis and Coele-Syria explicitly as Syria and ruled the Syrians as indigenous populations residing west of the Euphrates (Aramea) in contrast to Assyrians who had their native homeland in Mesopotamia east of the Euphrates.

This version of the name took hold in the Hellenic lands to the west of the old Assyrian Empire, thus during Greek Seleucid rule from 323 BC the name Assyria was altered to Syria, and this term was also applied to Aramea to the west which had been an Assyrian colony, and from this point the Greeks applied the term without distinction between the Assyrians of Mesopotamia and Arameans of the Levant. When the Seleucids lost control of Assyria to the Parthians they retained the corrupted term (Syria), applying it to ancient Aramea, while the Parthians called Assyria "Assuristan," a Parthian form of the original name. It is from this period that the Syrian vs Assyrian controversy arises.

The question of ethnic identity and self-designation is sometimes connected to the scholarly debate on the etymology of "Syria". The question has a long history of academic controversy, but majority mainstream opinion currently strongly favours that Syria is indeed ultimately derived from the Assyrian term Aššūrāyu. Meanwhile, some scholars has disclaimed the theory of Syrian being derived from Assyrian as "simply naive", and detracted its importance to the naming conflict.

Rudolf Macuch points out that the Eastern Neo-Aramaic press initially used the term "Syrian" (suryêta) and only much later, with the rise of nationalism, switched to "Assyrian" (atorêta). According to Tsereteli, however, a Georgian equivalent of "Assyrians" appears in ancient Georgian, Armenian and Russian documents. This correlates with the theory of the nations to the East of Mesopotamia knew the group as Assyrians, while to the West, beginning with Greek influence, the group was known as Syrians. Syria being a Greek corruption of Assyria. The debate appears to have been settled by the discovery of the Çineköy inscription in favour of Syria being derived from Assyria.

The Çineköy inscription is a Hieroglyphic Luwian-Phoenician bilingual, uncovered from Çineköy, Adana Province, Turkey (ancient Cilicia), dating to the 8th century BC. Originally published by Tekoglu and Lemaire (2000), it was more recently the subject of a 2006 paper published in the Journal of Near Eastern Studies, in which the author, Robert Rollinger, lends support to the age-old debate of the name "Syria" being derived from "Assyria" (see Etymology of Syria).

The object on which the inscription is found is a monument belonging to Urikki, vassal king of Hiyawa (i.e., Cilicia), dating to the eighth century BC. In this monumental inscription, Urikki made reference to the relationship between his kingdom and his Assyrian overlords. The Luwian inscription reads "Sura/i" whereas the Phoenician translation reads ’ŠR or "Ashur" which, according to Rollinger (2006), "settles the problem once and for all".

The modern terminological problem goes back to colonial times, but it became more acute in 1946, when with the independence of Syria, the adjective Syrian referred to an independent state. The controversy isn't restricted to exonyms like English "Assyrian" vs. "Aramaean", but also applies to self-designation in Neo-Aramaic, the minority "Aramaean" faction endorses both Sūryāyē  and Ārāmayē , while the majority "Assyrian" faction insists on Āṯūrāyē  but also accepts Sūryāyē.

Culture 

Assyrian culture is largely influenced by Christianity. There are many Assyrian customs that are common in other Middle Eastern cultures. Main festivals occur during religious holidays such as Easter and Christmas. There are also secular holidays such as Kha b-Nisan (vernal equinox).

People often greet and bid relatives farewell with a kiss on each cheek and by saying "" Shlama/Shlomo lokh, which means: "Peace be upon you" in Neo-Aramaic. Others are greeted with a handshake with the right hand only; according to Middle Eastern customs, the left hand is associated with evil. Similarly, shoes may not be left facing up, one may not have their feet facing anyone directly, whistling at night is thought to waken evil spirits, etc. A parent will often place an eye pendant on their baby to prevent "an evil eye being cast upon it". Spitting on anyone or their belongings is seen as a grave insult.

Assyrians are endogamous, meaning they generally marry within their own ethnic group, although exogamous marriages are not perceived as a taboo, unless the foreigner is of a different religious background, especially a Muslim. Throughout history, relations between the Assyrians and Armenians have tended to be very friendly, as both groups have practised Christianity since ancient times and have suffered through persecution under Muslim rulers. Therefore, mixed marriage between Assyrians and Armenians is quite common, most notably in Iraq, Iran, and as well as in the diaspora with adjacent Armenian and Assyrian communities.

Language 

The Neo-Aramaic languages, which are in the Semitic branch of the Afroasiatic language family, ultimately descend from Late Old Eastern Aramaic, the lingua franca in the later phase of the Neo-Assyrian Empire, which displaced the East Semitic Assyrian dialect of Akkadian and Sumerian. After being conquered by the Assyrians, many people, including the Arameans, were deported to the Assyrian heartland and elsewhere. Due to a large number of Aramaic-speaking Arameans, the Aramaization of Assyria began. The relationship between Arameans and Assyrians grew stronger, with Aramean scribes working with Assyrian ones. Around 700 B.C., the Aramaic alphabet took the place of cuneiform and became the official writing system of the Assyrian empire. Aramaic was the language of commerce, trade and communication and became the vernacular language of Assyria in classical antiquity. By the 1st century AD, Akkadian was extinct, although its influence on contemporary Eastern Neo-Aramaic languages spoken by Assyrians is significant and some loaned vocabulary still survives in these languages to this day.

To the native speaker, "Syriac" is usually called Surayt, Soureth, Suret or a similar regional variant. A wide variety of languages and dialects exist, including Assyrian Neo-Aramaic, Chaldean Neo-Aramaic, and Turoyo. Minority dialects include Senaya and Bohtan Neo-Aramaic, which are both near extinction. All are classified as Neo-Aramaic languages and are written using Syriac script, a derivative of the ancient Aramaic script. Jewish varieties such as Lishanid Noshan, Lishán Didán and Lishana Deni, written in the Hebrew script, are spoken by Assyrian Jews.

There is a considerable amount of mutual intelligibility between Assyrian Neo-Aramaic, Chaldean Neo-Aramaic, Senaya, Lishana Deni and Bohtan Neo-Aramaic. Therefore, these "languages" would generally be considered to be dialects of Assyrian Neo-Aramaic rather than separate languages. The Jewish Aramaic languages of Lishan Didan and Lishanid Noshan share a partial intelligibility with these varieties. The mutual intelligibility between the aforementioned languages and Turoyo is, depending on the dialect, limited to partial, and may be asymmetrical.

Being stateless, Assyrians are typically multilingual, speaking both their native language and learning those of the societies they reside in. While many Assyrians have fled from their traditional homeland recently, a substantial number still reside in Arabic-speaking countries speaking Arabic alongside the Neo-Aramaic languages and is also spoken by many Assyrians in the diaspora. The most commonly spoken languages by Assyrians in the diaspora are English, German and Swedish. Historically many Assyrians also spoke Turkish, Armenian, Azeri, Kurdish, and Persian and a smaller number of Assyrians that remain in Iran, Turkey (Istanbul and Tur Abdin) and Armenia still do today. Many loanwords from the aforementioned languages also exist in the Neo-Aramaic languages, with the Iranian languages and Turkish being the greatest influences overall. Only Turkey is reported to be experiencing a population increase of Assyrians in the four countries constituting their historical homeland, largely consisting of Assyrian refugees from Syria and a smaller number of Assyrians returning from the diaspora in Europe.

Script

Assyrians predominantly use the Syriac script, which is written from right to left. It is one of the Semitic abjads directly descending from the Aramaic alphabet and shares similarities with the Phoenician, Hebrew and the Arabic alphabets. It has 22 letters representing consonants, three of which can be also used to indicate vowels. The vowel sounds are supplied either by the reader's memory or by optional diacritic marks. Syriac is a cursive script where some, but not all, letters connect within a word. It was used to write the Syriac language from the 1st century AD.

The oldest and classical form of the alphabet is the  script. Although ʾEsṭrangēlā is no longer used as the main script for writing Syriac, it has received some revival since the 10th century, and it has been added to the Unicode Standard in September, 1999. The East Syriac dialect is usually written in the  form of the alphabet, which is often translated as "contemporary", reflecting its use in writing modern Neo-Aramaic. The West Syriac dialect is usually written in the  form of the alphabet. Most of the letters are clearly derived from ʾEsṭrangēlā, but are simplified, flowing lines.

Furthermore, for practical reasons, Assyrian people would also use the Latin alphabet, especially in social media.

Religion 

Assyrians belong to various Christian denominations, such as the Syriac Orthodox Church, which has over 1 million members around the world, the Chaldean Catholic Church, with about 600,000 members, the Assyrian Church of the East, with an estimated 400,000 members, and the Ancient Church of the East, with some 100,000 members. A small minority of Assyrians accepted the Protestant Reformation and became Reform Orthodox in the 20th century, possibly due to British influences, and are now organized in the Assyrian Evangelical Church, the Assyrian Pentecostal Church and other Protestant/Reform Orthodox Assyrian groups. While there are some atheist Assyrians, they tend to still associate with some denomination.

Many members of the following churches consider themselves Assyrian. Ethnic identities are often deeply intertwined with religion, a legacy of the Ottoman Millet system. The group is traditionally characterized as adhering to various churches of Syriac Christianity and speaking Neo-Aramaic languages. It is subdivided into:
 adherents of the Assyrian Church of the East and Ancient Church of the East following the East Syriac Rite, also known as Nestorians
 adherents of the Chaldean Catholic Church following the East Syriac Rite, also known as Chaldeans
 adherents of the Syriac Orthodox Church following the West Syriac Rite, also known as Jacobites
 adherents of the Syriac Catholic Church following the West Syriac Rite

Baptism and First Communion are celebrated extensively, similar to a Brit Milah or Bar Mitzvah in Jewish communities. After a death, a gathering is held three days after burial to celebrate the ascension to heaven of the dead person, as of Jesus; after seven days another gathering commemorates their death. A close family member wears only black clothes for forty days and nights, or sometimes a year, as a sign of mourning.

During the "Seyfo" genocide, there were a number of Assyrians who were forced to convert to Islam. They reside in Turkey, and practice Islam but still retain their identity. A small number of Assyrian Jews exist as well.

Music 

Assyrian music is a combination of traditional folk music and western contemporary music genres, namely pop and soft rock, but also electronic dance music. Instruments traditionally used by Assyrians include the zurna and davula, but has expanded to include guitars, pianos, violins, synthesizers (keyboards and electronic drums), and other instruments.

Some well known Assyrian singers in modern times are Ashur Bet Sargis, Sargon Gabriel, Evin Agassi, Janan Sawa, Juliana Jendo, and Linda George. Assyrian artists that traditionally sing in other languages include Melechesh, Timz and Aril Brikha. Assyrian-Australian band Azadoota performs its songs in the Assyrian language whilst using a western style of instrumentation.

The first international Aramaic Music Festival was held in Lebanon in August 2008 for Assyrian people internationally.

Dance 

Assyrians have numerous traditional dances which are performed mostly for special occasions such as weddings. Assyrian dance is a blend of both ancient indigenous and general Near Eastern elements. Assyrian folk dances are mainly made up of circle dances that are performed in a line, which may be straight, curved, or both. The most common form of Assyrian folk dance is khigga, which is routinely danced as the bride and groom are welcomed into the wedding reception. Most of the circle dances allow unlimited number of participants, with the exception of the Sabre Dance, which require three at most. Assyrian dances would vary from weak to strong, depending on the mood and tempo of a song.

Festivals 
Assyrian festivals tend to be closely associated with their Christian faith, of which Easter is the most prominent of the celebrations. Members of the Assyrian Church of the East, Chaldean Catholic Church and Syriac Catholic Church follow the Gregorian calendar and as a result celebrate Easter on a Sunday between March 22 and April 25 inclusively. However, members of the Syriac Orthodox Church and Ancient Church of the East celebrate Easter on a Sunday between April 4 and May 8 inclusively on the Gregorian calendar (March 22 and April 25 on the Julian calendar). During Lent, Assyrians are encouraged to fast for 50 days from meat and any other foods which are animal based.

Assyrians celebrate a number of festivals unique to their culture and traditions as well as religious ones:
 Kha b-Nisan , the Assyrian New Year, traditionally on April 1, though usually celebrated on January 1. Assyrians usually wear traditional costumes and hold social events including parades and parties, dancing, and listening to poets telling the story of creation.
 Sauma d-Ba'utha , the Nineveh fast, is a three-day period of fasting and prayer.
 Somikka, All Saints Day, is celebrated to motivate children to fast during Lent through use of frightening costumes
 Kalu d'Sulaqa, feast of the Bride of the Ascension, celebrates Assyrian resistance to the invasion of Assyria by Tamerlane
 Nusardyl, commemorating the baptism of the Assyrians of Urmia by St. Thomas.
 Sharra d'Mart Maryam, usually on August 15, a festival and feast celebrating St. Mary with games, food, and celebration.
 Other Sharras (special festivals) include: Sharra d'Mart Shmuni, Sharra d'Mar Shimon Bar-Sabbaye, Sharra d'Mar Mari, and Shara d'Mar Zaia, Mar Bishu, Mar Sawa, Mar Sliwa, and Mar Odisho
 Yoma d'Sah'deh (Day of Martyrs), commemorating the thousands massacred in the Simele massacre and the hundreds of thousands massacred in the Assyrian genocide. It is commemorated annually on August 7.

Assyrians also practice unique marriage ceremonies. The rituals performed during weddings are derived from many different elements from the past 3,000 years. An Assyrian wedding traditionally lasted a week. Today, weddings in the Assyrian homeland usually last 2–3 days; in the Assyrian diaspora they last 1–2 days.

Traditional clothing 

Assyrian clothing varies from village to village. Clothing is usually blue, red, green, yellow, and purple; these colors are also used as embroidery on a white piece of clothing. Decoration is lavish in Assyrian costumes, and sometimes involves jewellery. The conical hats of traditional Assyrian dress have changed little over millennia from those worn in ancient Mesopotamia, and until the 19th and early 20th centuries the ancient Mesopotamian tradition of braiding or platting of hair, beards and moustaches was still commonplace.

Cuisine

Assyrian cuisine is similar to other Middle Eastern cuisines, in particula and is rich in grains, meat, potato, cheese, bread and tomatoes. Typically, rice is served with every meal, with a stew poured over it. Tea is a popular drink, and there are several dishes of desserts, snacks, and beverages. Alcoholic drinks such as wine and wheat beer are organically produced and drunk. Assyrian cuisine is primarily identical to Iraqi/Mesopotamian cuisine, as well as being very similar to other Middle Eastern and Caucasian cuisines, as well as Greek cuisine, Levantine cuisine, Turkish cuisine, Iranian cuisine, Israeli cuisine, and Armenian cuisine, with most dishes being similar to the cuisines of the area in which those Assyrians live/originate from. It is rich in grains such as barley, meat, tomato, herbs, spices, cheese, and potato as well as herbs, fermented dairy products, and pickles.

Genetics 

Late-20th-century DNA analysis conducted by Cavalli-Sforza, Paolo Menozzi and Alberto Piazza, "shows that Assyrians have a distinct genetic profile that distinguishes their population from any other population." Genetic analyses of the Assyrians of Persia demonstrated that they were "closed" with little "intermixture" with the Muslim Persian population and that an individual Assyrian's genetic makeup is relatively close to that of the Assyrian population as a whole. "The genetic data are compatible with historical data that religion played a major role in maintaining the Assyrian population's separate identity during the Christian era".

In a 2006 study of the Y chromosome DNA of six regional Armenian populations, including, for comparison, Assyrians and Syrians, researchers found that, "the Semitic populations (Assyrians and Syrians) are very distinct from each other according to both [comparative] axes. This difference supported also by other methods of comparison points out the weak genetic affinity between the two populations with different historical destinies." A 2008 study on the genetics of "old ethnic groups in Mesopotamia", including 340 subjects from seven ethnic communities ("Assyrian, Jewish, Zoroastrian, Armenian, Turkmen, the Arab peoples in Iran, Iraq, and Kuwait") found that Assyrians were homogeneous with respect to all other ethnic groups sampled in the study, regardless of religious affiliation.

In a 2011 study focusing on the genetics of Marsh Arabs of Iraq, researchers identified Y chromosome haplotypes shared by Marsh Arabs, Iraqis, and Assyrians, "supporting a common local background." In a 2017 study focusing on the genetics of Northern Iraqi populations, it was found that Iraqi Assyrians and Iraqi Yazidis clustered together, but away from the other Northern Iraqi populations analyzed in the study, and largely in between the West Asian and Southeastern European populations. According to the study, "contemporary Assyrians and Yazidis from northern Iraq may in fact have a stronger continuity with the original genetic stock of the Mesopotamian people, which possibly provided the basis for the ethnogenesis of various subsequent Near Eastern populations".

Haplogroups
Y-DNA haplogroup J-M304 has been measured at 55% among Assyrians of Iraq, Syria, Lebanon, and diaspora; while it has been found at 11% among Assyrians of Iran. Haplogroup T-M184 [reported as K*] has been measured at 15.09% among Assyrians in Armenia. The haplogroup is frequent in Middle Eastern Jews, Georgians, Druze and Somalians. According to a 2011 study by Lashgary et al., R1b [reported as R*(xR1a)] has been measured at 40% among Assyrians in Iran, making it major haplogroup among Iranian Assyrians. Yet another DNA test comprising 48 Assyrian male subjects from Iran, the Y-DNA haplogroups J-M304, found in its greatest concentration in the Arabian peninsula, and the northern R-M269, were also frequent at 29.2% each. Lashgary et al. explain the presence of haplogroup R in Iranian Assyrians as well as in other Assyrian communities (~23%) as a consequence of mixing with Armenians and assimilation/integration of different peoples carrying haplogroup R, while explain its frequency as a result of genetic drift due to small population size and endogamy due to religious barriers.

Haplogroup J2 has been measured at 13.4%, which is commonly found in the Fertile Crescent, the Caucasus, Anatolia, Italy, coastal Mediterranean, and the Iranian plateau.

See also

Notes

References

Sources

External links 
 
 BetNahrain – Assyrian Center in Armenia
 YouTube-Video: Associate professor Svante Lundgren elaborates on the history and origin of the Assyrian people
 A virtual Assyria: Cyberland
 A virtual Assyria: Christians from the Middle East
 Traditional Assyrian Costumes
 Assyrian Iraqi Document Projects
 Who Are Assyrians?
 Assyrian History
 Aramean History

 
Ethnic groups in Iran
Ethnic groups in Iraq
Ethnic groups in Syria
Ethnic groups in the Middle East
Ethnic groups in Turkey
Indigenous peoples of Western Asia
Oriental Orthodoxy in Iran
Oriental Orthodoxy in Iraq
Oriental Orthodoxy in Syria
Oriental Orthodoxy in Turkey